Synersaga kuni is a moth in the family Lecithoceridae. It is found in Vietnam.

References

Moths described in 2007
kuni